The 2012–13 Irish League Cup (known as the Irn-Bru League Cup for sponsorship reasons) was the 27th edition of Northern Ireland's secondary football knock-out cup competition. It was contested by the twelve members of the IFA Premiership, as well as the 29 members of the IFA Championship. The competition began on 14 August 2012, and ended with the final on 26 January 2013.

Crusaders were the defending champions after defeating Coleraine 1–0 in the 2011–12 final. They reached the final again this season, but were unable to defend the trophy as they were defeated 4–0 by Cliftonville in the final, who lifted the cup for the second time. This made it six different winners of the cup in the last six seasons. The 4–0 scoreline equalled the record for the highest in a final, set when Linfield defeated Coleraine by the same score in 2000.

Format
The competition was played in a straight knock-out format and was open to all members of the IFA Premiership and both divisions of the IFA Championship. Twenty clubs from the IFA Championship entered in the first round, with the remaining ten Championship clubs given byes into the second round. They were joined by the twelve members of the IFA Premiership. Newry City were expelled from the IFA this season and their result in the second round match against Dergview was expunged from the records. Replays were not used in the competition - all matches used extra time and penalties to determine the winner if necessary.

First round
The draw for the first round was made on 24 July 2012. The games were played on 14 August 2012. The first round draw was made randomly and included all 29 clubs from the IFA Championship. 20 of those clubs were drawn to face each other with the remaining 9 receiving a bye into the next round.

Armagh City, Ballymoney United, Bangor, Carrick Rangers, Coagh United, Dundela, Institute, Killymoon Rangers, and Limavady United all received byes into the second round.

|}

Second round
The draw for the second round was also made on 24 July 2012. The games were played on 27 August 2012. The draw was later revised, switching some venues to the club originally drawn to play away from home.

The 12 members of the IFA Premiership entered the draw at this stage, along with the 10 winners from the first round matches, and the 9 clubs that received byes. Dergview were effectively given a bye to the third round, after their 2–1 second round victory over Newry City was later expunged from the official records. The draw was seeded so that the IFA Premiership clubs and the top 4 clubs from last season's second tier (IFA Championship 1) avoided each other.

|}

Third round
The draw for the third round was made on 29 August 2012. Six clubs from IFA Championship 1 made it through to the third round along with the ten remaining clubs from the top flight, but none made it through from Championship 2. The matches were played on 9 October 2012.

|}

Quarter-finals
The quarter-finals draw was made on 10 October 2012. No club from outside the IFA Premiership reached this stage. The matches were played on 5 November 2012.

Semi-finals
The semi-finals draw was made on 7 November 2012. The matches were played on 11 December 2012.

Final
The final was played on 26 January 2013 at Windsor Park.

References

External links
 2012–13 Irish League Cup results

Lea
2012–13 domestic association football cups
2012-13